Raptor or RAPTOR may refer to:

Animals

The word "raptor" refers to several groups of bird-like dinosaurs which primarily capture and subdue/kill prey with their talons.

 Raptor (bird) or bird of prey, a bird that primarily hunts and feeds on vertebrates 
 Raptor- or -raptor, a taxonomic affix used in to describe dromeosaurs or similar animals
 Dromaeosauridae, a family of dinosaurs including Velociraptor, informally known as raptors

Arts and entertainment

Film and television
 Raptor (film), a 2001 film
 Raptor, a fictional spacecraft in Battlestar Galactica

Gaming
 Raptor: Call of the Shadows, a 1994 video game
 Raptor heavy fighter, a fictional craft in the Wing Commander game
 Lord Raptor, a Darkstalkers character

In print
 Raptor (novel), a 1993 novel by Gary Jennings
 Raptor (Gary Wilton, Jr.), a Marvel Comics character
 Raptor (Damon Ryder), a Marvel Comics character
 Raptor (Brenda Drago), a Marvel Comics character

Roller coasters
 Raptor (Fantasilandia), a roller coaster in Santiago, Chile
 Raptor (Gardaland), a roller coaster in Lake Garda, Italy
 Raptor (Cedar Point), a roller coaster in Sandusky, Ohio, U.S.

Other arts and entertainment
 Raptor (Thai duo), a music group
 Rex Raptor, a Yu-Gi-Oh! character

Computers and programming
 Raptor (programming language), a graphical authoring tool
 Raptor (robot), a South Korean bipedal robot
 RAPTOR (software), protein threading software
 Western Digital Raptor, hard disk drives
 Raptor code, error correction code
 Gecko (software) or Raptor
 Raptor RDF, from the Redland RDF Application Framework
 Raptor Computing Systems/Raptor Engineering, a company which sells computers with POWER9 processors

Military
 Lockheed Martin F-22 Raptor, a United States Air Force stealth fighter aircraft
 HSM-71 or the Raptors, a U.S. Navy helicopter squadron
 VMMT-204 or the Raptors, a U.S. Marine Corps Osprey training squadron
 Raptor-class patrol boat, a series of Russian high-speed coastal patrol boats
 RAPTOR (Reconnaissance Airborne Pod Tornado), a British Royal Air Force reconnaissance pod

Sport
 Toronto Raptors, a Canadian basketball team in the NBA
 Raptors 905, a Canadian basketball team in the G-League; minor league affiliate of the Toronto Raptors
 Bangalore Raptors, an Indian tennis team  
 Bengaluru Raptors, an Indian badminton team 
 Colorado Raptors, an American rugby union team 
 Dunkin' Raptors, a Thai basketball team
 Everett Raptors, an American indoor football team 
 Iowa Raptors FC, an American soccer team
 Lancashire Raptors, a British ice hockey team 
 Raptors Naucalpan, a Mexican American football team 
 Ogden Raptors, an American baseball team
 Rockford Raptors, an American soccer team 
 Raptor, a downhill Birds of Prey ski course in Colorado, U.S.

Transportation

Air
 Aviate Raptor, a South African trike
 Independence Raptor, a German paraglider
 Raptor Aircraft Raptor, an American light aircraft kit
 Skif Raptor, a Ukrainian paraglider

Land
 Ford Raptor, a line of pickup trucks
 Yamaha Raptor 660, an all-terrain vehicle
 Zagato Raptor, a concept car design 
 Raptor, motorcycles by Cagiva

Sea
 Raptor, a car ferry class used by Red Funnel

Space 
SpaceX Raptor, a rocket engine

Other uses
 RPTOR, also known as raptor, a regulatory-associated protein  
 Raptor (G.I. Joe), an action figure 
 Raptor convention, a convention in contract bridge
 Raptor, a series of Peavey guitars
 Raptor Group, a private investing company founded by James Pallotta
 Raptor suite, Resuscitation with Angiography, Percutaneous Techniques and Operative Repair, type of trauma hybrid operating room

See also
 Rapture (disambiguation)
 RPTOR, a human gene